KNSS-FM (98.7 MHz, "News Talk 98.7 and 1330") is a commercial radio station licensed to Clearwater, Kansas, and serving the Wichita metropolitan area.  It carries a talk radio format and is owned by Audacy, Inc. The station simulcasts with co-owned KNSS 1330 AM.  The studios and offices are on East Douglas Avenue in Wichita.

KNSS-FM has an effective radiated power of 50,000 watts.  The transmitter is on West 100th Avenue North at North Chicaskia Road in Conway Springs, Kansas.  KNSS-FM broadcasts in the HD Radio hybrid format.  The HD2 subchannel simulcasts the sports radio format heard on co-owned KFH 1240 AM.  The HD3 subchannel airs the national BetQL Audio Network format along with some CBS Sports Radio programming.

Programming
Weekdays on KNSS-AM-FM begin with Steve & Ted, a news and interview show featuring Steve McIntosh and Ted Woodward.  The rest of the schedule is made up of nationally syndicated conservative talk shows:  The Glenn Beck Program, The Rush Limbaugh Show, The Sean Hannity Show, The Mark Levin Show, Savage Nation with Michael Savage, The Ben Shapiro Show and Coast to Coast AM with George Noory.

Weekends feature shows on money, health, retirement, food and wine, some of which are paid brokered programming.  Weekend syndicated shows include: Handel on The Law with Bill Handel, The Truth About Money with Ric Edelman and Sunday Night Live with Bill Cunningham as well as repeats of weekday shows.  Most hours begin with world and national news from Fox News Radio.  During NFL football season, KNSS-AM-FM carry Kansas City Chiefs broadcasts.

History
98.7 FM was issued a construction permit on March 27, 1992, issued as KSQB. The station signed on July 4, 1995, with a country format as KSPG, "The Kansas Pig". The station was initially owned by former KBUZ owner Gary Violet, with Wichita-based Great Empire Broadcasting (owners of country formatted KFDI (AM) and FM) providing sales and marketing for the station. On May 19, 1997, KSPG flipped to Hot AC as KAYY, "K98.7". Entercom (now Audacy) bought the station in February 2000. On May 31, 2000, KAYY became the new home of smooth jazz-formatted KWSJ. The format was moved from its temporary frequency at 92.7 FM (now KGHF) and was originally on 105.3 FM (now KFBZ). KWSJ's smooth jazz format was dropped on March 25, 2002, and flipped to a simulcast with AM sister station KFH; concurrently, the station changed call letters to KFH-FM, which were formerly used on 97.9 FM (now KRBB).

On May 9, 2011, KFH AM and -FM changed their format to sports talk.

During the summer of 2016, KFH began simulcasting on translator K248CY (97.5 FM) in Wichita, enabling the station to be heard on three separate frequencies (97.5/98.7 FM and 1240 AM). However, it offered a more stable signal in the eastern part of the Wichita metropolitan area. Entercom announced in October of that year that KNSS would be taking over the 98.7 frequency, giving Wichita its first full-power FM news/talk station since KFH's 2011 switch to sports.

References

External links

News and talk radio stations in the United States
NSS-FM
Radio stations established in 1995
1995 establishments in Kansas
Audacy, Inc. radio stations